Ana Almansa Suárez (born 24 August 1963) is a Spanish former professional tennis player who won a gold medal at the 1983 Mediterranean Games. 

From 1982 to 1986, she appeared in ten Federation Cup ties for Spain.

After retiring, she coached Conchita Martínez, among other players.

See also
List of Spain Fed Cup team representatives

References

External links
 
 

1963 births
Living people
Spanish female tennis players
Mediterranean Games gold medalists for Spain
Mediterranean Games medalists in tennis
Competitors at the 1983 Mediterranean Games
Tennis players from the Valencian Community
20th-century Spanish women